Carl Gunderson (June 20, 1864February 26, 1933)  was an American politician who served as the 11th Governor of South Dakota. Gunderson, a Republican from Mitchell, South Dakota, served from 1925 to 1927.

Biography
Gunderson was born in a log cabin in Clay County in the Dakota Territory, near Vermillion. As a young man, he filed a claim on a homestead in Clay County that remained dear to him all his life.  He stated that his occupation was a farmer all his life.  He attended the University of South Dakota and Cornell University.  He went into the mercantile business in Vermillion.  He married Gertrude Bertleson and they had four children.

Career
Gunderson served five terms in the state senate of the South Dakota Legislature, being elected in 1892, 1896, 1898, 1900, and again in 1916.  Gunderson served as president pro tempore of the senate in the 1899 session and served as the 13th Lieutenant Governor of South Dakota from 1921 to 1925 under Governor William H. McMaster.

In 1924, when McMaster declined to seek re-election, Gunderson successfully ran to succeed him. He defeated the Democratic nominee, William J. Bulow, in a landslide. In 1926, however, Gunderson narrowly lost to Bulow in a rematch of the 1924 election. He ran for Governor again in 1930. In the Republican primary, no candidate received 35% of the vote, and under state law, the nomination had to be decided by a convention of the state Republican Party. Despite placing second in the primary, Gunderson fared poorly in the convention; his support collapsed quickly and he faded from contention after the first few ballots. In 1932, Gunderson challenged Republican Governor Warren Green for renomination, but lost the Republican primary in a landslide.

Death
After his defeat he returned to his home in Mitchell until his death on February 26, 1933. He was buried on the tract of land that he had homesteaded, Bluff View Cemetery, Vermillion, Clay County, South Dakota US.

References

External links
National Governors Association

1864 births
1933 deaths
Republican Party governors of South Dakota
Lieutenant Governors of South Dakota
Republican Party South Dakota state senators
American people of Norwegian descent
People from Vermillion, South Dakota